Khandan is a 1965 Indian Hindi language film directed by A. Bhimsingh. The film stars Sunil Dutt, Nutan, Pran, Om Prakash, Lalita Pawar, Helen and Mumtaz. The film's music is by Ravi. A box-office success, the film became the seventh highest earning film of 1965, earning an approximate gross of Rs. 2,80,00,000 and a net of Rs. 1,40,00,000. The film was a remake of director's own Tamil film Bhaaga Pirivinai.

Plot
Two young men, Jeevandas and Shankar inherit a substantial area of farmland on their father Ramswaroop Lal's passing. Jeevandas marries Bhagwanti, but they are childless, while Shankar marries Parvati and they have two sons, Govind and Shyam. Govind becomes paralysed in his right hand, due to an accident (electric shock). Many years in the future, Shyam leaves to become educated in the city, but on returning finds the family split in two by disagreement and bitterness; Jeevandas, Bhagwanti, Shyam, Navrangi and Neelima on one side, and Govind, his wife, Radha, Shankar and Parvati on the other. He borrows more money, this time from Shyam, to purchase an elephant. Govind and Radha soon celebrate the birth of a completely healthy baby boy, Navjeevandas Lal. Later, Navrangi intends to begin staging a show using the elephant at the carnival, where a boy is thrown from the trunk, and he intends using Govind's son. Later, Navjeevandas is abducted by Navrangi. Govind and Radha get to the carnival and save Navjeevandas. Navrangi attacks Govind, but surprisingly, Govind is snapped out of paralysis and fights Navrangi. Moments later, when Navrangi is about to kill Govind and Shyam, Jeevandas and the rest of the family intervenes and discovers that he started the division of their home. Later, Navrangi is arrested and Govind and Shyam tear down the wall that separated the house. In the end, Jeevandas recites a prayer with the rest of the family united.

Cast
 Om Prakash ... Jeevandas Lal
 Lalita Pawar ... Bhagwanti Jeevandas Lal
 Manmohan Krishna ... Shankar Lal
 Sulochana Chatterjee ... Parvati Shankar Lal
 Sunil Dutt ... Govind Shankar Lal
 Nutan ... Radha Govind Lal
 Sudesh Kumar ... Shyam Shankar Lal
 Mumtaz ... Neelima Shyam Lal
 Pran... Navrangi
 Mohan Choti ... Manmauji
 Helen ... Jati (Dancer)
 Jeevankala ... Sati (Dancer)

Soundtrack
The music of the movie was composed by Ravi, and won him Filmfare Award for Best Music Director.

Awards
 Filmfare Best Actor Award for Sunil Dutt
 Filmfare Best Music Director Award for Ravi
 Filmfare Best Female Playback Award for Lata Mangeshkar for "Tumhi Meri Mandir"
 Filmfare Best Lyricist Award for Rajendra Krishan for "Tumhi Meri Mandir"

References

External links 
 

1965 films
1960s Hindi-language films
Hindi remakes of Tamil films
Films directed by A. Bhimsingh
Films scored by Ravi